Hofschneider is a surname. Notable people with the surname include:

André Hofschneider (born 1970), German footballer and manager
Heinz Hofschneider (born 1957), American politician
Jude Hofschneider (born 1966), American politician
Marco Hofschneider (born 1969), German actor

German-language surnames